Fred Venturelli (August 22, 1917 – January 20, 1990) was an American football placekicker.

Biography
Venturelli was born on August 22, 1917, in Farmington, Illinois. On September 21, 1940, he married Marguerite Heuer. Venturelli died on January 20, 1990, in Racine, Wisconsin. He was buried in Mount Pleasant, Wisconsin.

Career
Venturelli was briefly a member of the Chicago Bears during the 1948 NFL season. He did not play at the college level.

References

People from Farmington, Illinois
Sportspeople from Racine, Wisconsin
Players of American football from Illinois
Players of American football from Wisconsin
Chicago Bears players
American football placekickers
1917 births
1990 deaths
Burials in Wisconsin